The 2009 Nigeria Entertainment Awards was held at Howard University Cramton Auditorium on June 9, 2009. It was hosted by Omoni Oboli and Ebbe Bassey

Awards

 Best Album of the Year
 Entertainer (D'Banj)
 My P (Naeto C)
 Unstoppable (Tuface)
 Undareyted (Dare)
 Talk About It (MI)

 Hottest Single of the Year
 "Big Boy" (Eldee)
 "Good or Bad" (J Martins)
 "Shayo" (Durella)
 "Bumper to Bumper" (Wande Coal)
 "Efi Mile" (YQ Ft Dagrin)

 Best New Act of the Year
 MI
 Durella
 YQ
 J Martins
 Bigiano

 Gospel Artist of the Year
 Midnight Crew
 Nikki Laoye
 Roof Top Mcs
 Lara George
 Yinka Aiyefele

 Music Producer of the Year
 Eldee
 ID Cabasa
 Jay Slick
 Cohbams Asuquo
 Don Jazzy

 Best Rapper
 Mode 9
 MI
 Naeto C
 Ikechukwu
 Sauce Kid

 Best Music Video of the Year
 "Kini Big Deal" (Neato C)
 "Suddenly" (D’Banj)
 "Not the Girl" (Dare)
 "Good or Bad" (J Martins)
 "Bosi Gbangba" (Eldee)

 Best International Artist
 Banky W
 Naira
 Iceberg Slim
 Asa
 Kelly Handsome

 Best International Promoter of the Year
 Dapo Kush
 Tunes
 Kid Konnect
 Keno
 Dognomite

 Event of the Year
 Sisi Ologe (Lagos)
 Nigerian Reunion (US)
 Rhythm Unplugged
 This Day/Arise NY Fash Week (US)
 Miss Nigeria USA

 Best World DJ
 DJ X Chris
 DJ Snoop Da Damaga
 DJ Sose
 DJ Mighty Mike
 DJ Neptune

 Best Comedian
 I Go Dye
 Klint De Drunk
 Tee A
 Ayo Makun
 Jedi

 Best Actor
 Desmond Elliot
 Jim Iyke
 Saheed Balogun
 Ramsey Noah
 Mike Ezuronye

 Best Actress
 Mercy Johnson
 Omotola Jalade
 Rita Dominic
 Genevieve Nnaji
 Funke Akindele

 Indigenous Artist of the Year
 Yinka Ayifele
 Pasuma
 Toba Gold
 Dagrin
 9ice

References

Nigeria Entertainment Awards
Nigeria Entertainment Awards
Entertainment Awards
Nigeria Entertainment Awards
Entertainment Awards
Nigeria Entertainment Awards